A turbah, or mohr, also known as khāk-e shefā (also used in Urdu) and sejde gāh (also used in Urdu), is a small piece of soil or clay, often a clay tablet, used during salat (Islamic daily prayers) to symbolize earth. The use of a turbah is recommended in the Twelver Shia school of Islam, a unique practice of the sect, and many Hadiths mention the benefits of prostration (Sajda) upon soil or an alternative natural material. The most favoured soil is that of Karbala, the site of the martyrdom of Husayn ibn Ali; however, soil from anywhere may be used. In the absence of soil, plants or items made from plants may be substituted. This provision has been extended to include the use of paper.

Following the instruction from the Quran, Shia Imam Ja'far al-Sadiq stated that "prostration must be performed on pure earth or what grows on it, provided that it is not eaten or worn." For example, prostration on paper is permissible because it is made of natural elements grown on earth.

Muhammad and the use of the turbah
According to Abu Sa`id al-Khudri: “I saw Allah’s Apostle prostrating in mud and water and saw the marl of mud on his forehead.” Though Muhammad prayed on the ground, the hadith Sahih al-Bukhari states that "Allah’s Apostle used to pray on Khumra."

The idea of "absolute consideration" states that some kinds of soil, and thus some kinds of places are better than others for prayer. For example, places, buildings, and structures related to Allah and Muhammad are held in the highest regard when it comes to places in which to hold prayer.

Significance of Karbala

Karbala is especially important to Shi’ah Muslims because the martyrdom of Husayn ibn Ali is considered one of the major dividing lines between Muslims of the time. Husayn is important because of his relationship with Muhammad, and so therefore the dust from Karbala is considered to be one of the most sacred places to pray.

Since there are Muslims located all over the world, Shi’ah Muslims have created small clay tablets called mohr or Turbah from the ground of Karbala. However, since it is an issue of honor and respect, Muslims are allowed to prostrate on other earthen materials.

Significance and symbolism

Turbah has a primary meaning of 'dirt', 'earth' or 'soil', identified as the material God used to create the earth and humankind. Turbah also denotes any ground on which one prostrates oneself for prayer. Clean dirt or dust can serve as a substitute for someone who is performing ablutions in the absence of clean water, a practice known as tayammum.

Turbah is also used in connection with funerals because of death's association with dust: a dead body eventually turns to earth after death.

Sunni views
Many Sunnis reject the use of Turbah as bidah (innovation), noting that according to them neither Muhammad nor his companions ever carried a clay tablet (or any other small item) on which to place their foreheads while in prostration. They also note that many Turbah used by Shia have inscribed invocations to their revered figures, such as 'Ya Hussein' (O Hussein), or 'Ya Zahra' which may be seen by them as Shirk (associating partners with God). In Majmoo' al-Fatawa (Compilation of Fatawa), Ibn Taymiyyah, issued a fatwa that prayer on a Turbah from the site of Imam Husayn's martyrdom (Karbala) is an innovation.

References

External links

In a nutshell: Why do the Shi'ah prostrate on Turbah?
Turbah

Salah
Shia Islam
Salah terminology